Bothwell Chapungu (born 22 November 1987) is a Zimbabwean first-class cricketer. He was included in Zimbabwe's squad for the 2016 Africa T20 Cup.

References

External links
 

1987 births
Living people
Zimbabwean cricketers
Centrals cricketers
Mid West Rhinos cricketers
Midlands cricketers
Sportspeople from Kwekwe